Calochilus stramenicola, commonly known as the wandoo beard orchid, is a species of orchid endemic to Western Australia. It has a single smooth, erect leaf and up to seven dull greenish flowers with reddish brown or purplish stripes. The labellum has a purplish beard with a ridge between two "eye" spots.

Description
The column has two dark coloured "eyes" joined by a ridge. Flowering occurs in September and October.

Taxonomy and naming
Calochilus stramenicola was first formally described in 2006 by David Jones and the description was published in Australian Orchid Research. The specific epithet (stramenicola) is derived from the Latin word stramen meaning "straw", "litter" or "any material for bedding down" with the suffix -cola meaning "dweller", referring to the preference of this species for growing in accumulations of litter.

Distribution and habitat
The wandoo beard orchid grows in thick accumulations of litter in wandoo woodland. It is found in a narrow band between Narrogin and Wannamal in the Avon Wheatbelt, Jarrah Forest and Swan Coastal Plain biogeographic regions.

References

stramenicola
Orchids of Western Australia
Endemic orchids of Australia
Plants described in 2006
Endemic flora of Western Australia